"Nothin' Better to Do" is a song co-written and recorded by American country music artist LeAnn Rimes.  It was released in May 2007 as the lead-off single to her album Family.  It was Rimes' fourteenth Top 20 hit on the U.S. Billboard Hot Country Songs chart, peaking at number 14 in December 2007.  Rimes wrote the song with then-husband Dean Sheremet and Darrell Brown.

Rimes set a record on the Billboard charts by being the first artist to simultaneously chart with a single on their Country, AC, and Club Play charts with "Nothin' Better to Do." The song was also nominated for a Grammy Award for Best Female Country Vocal Performance.

Content

"Nothin' Better to Do" is an up-tempo song, backed by primarily by acoustic guitar and banjo. The song's female narrator, a young Mississippi woman, describes being a restless lover, running around with some boys. Her mom expresses her disapproval of her daughter's behavior, but the narrator believes there is "nothin' better to do."

Mama said, "Idle hands are Devil's handywork"
Oh, the trouble you'll get into
You got nothin' better to do, got nothin' better to do
You got nothin' better to do, got nothin' better to do
Yeah!

Rimes co-wrote the song with musician Darrell Brown and then-husband Dean Sheremet.

Track listing
Digital Download
 Nothin' Better to Do (Bimbo Jones Radio Edit) 3:03
 Nothin' Better to Do (Soul Seekerz Radio Edit) 3:19
 Nothin' Better to Do (Bimbo Jones Mix) 7:56
 Nothin' Better to Do (Soul Seekerz Extended Mix) 7:51
 Nothin' Better to Do (Soul Seekerz Dub Vocal Mix) 7:51
 Nothin' Better to Do (Jason Nevins Club Electro Dub) 6:53
 Strong (Cicada Mix) 7:17

UK CD single
 Nothin' Better to Do 3:51
 Probably Wouldn't Be This Way (Dann Huff Remix) 3:42

Music video
The music video, which was co-directed by Rimes with David McClister, was released in May 2007. In the video, Rimes is shown in a Women's Correctional Facility, performing choreography with fellow inmates and singing into an old-fashioned microphone. This leads up to a prison break, which is led by Rimes; she is the only inmate to escape, but she is stopped in the prison yard shortly after when the gate closes. This video was her directorial debut.

Chart performance
"Nothin' Better to Do" debuted at number 55 on the U.S. Billboard Hot Country Songs chart; it was a Top 20 hit, reaching a peak of number 14 in December 2007. The song also experienced some crossover success, reaching the Top 20 on the U.S. Billboard Hot Adult Contemporary Tracks chart and the Top 10 on the U.S. Billboard Hot Dance Club Play chart. Additionally, it reached number 48 on the UK Singles Chart.

References

External links
 "Nothin' Better to Do" official music video at CMT.com

2007 singles
2007 songs
LeAnn Rimes songs
Songs written by Darrell Brown (musician)
Song recordings produced by Dann Huff
Curb Records singles
Songs written by LeAnn Rimes